Major General John Soame Richardson,  (16 March 1836 – 9 June 1896) was a British Army officer and Commander of the Forces in colonial New South Wales.

Richardson was born in Heydon, Norfolk, England, and entered the British Army in 1854. The following year, he served with the 72nd Highlanders in the Crimean War, and was present at the siege and fall of Sebastopol for which he received the Crimea Medal with clasp and the Turkish Crimea Medal. In the New Zealand Wars he served with the 1st Battalion, 12th (East Suffolk) Regiment of Foot in the Taranaki district, and in the Waikato campaign in 1863 and 1864.

Richardson was awarded the New Zealand War Medal, became captain in 1863 and, retiring from the Imperial service, was in 1865 appointed to command the military forces of New South Wales, with the rank of lieutenant colonel. He became colonel in 1876 and major general in 1885, following his command of the New South Wales Contingent despatched to co-operate with the British forces in the Sudan campaign. He was also created Companion of the Order of the Bath, mentioned in despatches, and received the Egyptian Medal with clasp "Suakin 1885" and the Khedive's Star in recognition of his services.

John Soame Richardson died on 9 June 1896.

References

External links
 Museums Victoria Collections, John Soame Richardson Medal. Retrieved 26 June 2020.
 Death of Major-General Richardson. Australian Town and Country Journal, 20 June 1896, p. 20. Retrieved 26 June 2020.
 Australian War Memorial. New South Wales Contingent. Soudan Campaign, 1885. A photograph montage of portraits. Retrieved 26 June 2020.

1836 births
1896 deaths
72nd Highlanders officers
Australian generals
British Army personnel of the Crimean War
British military personnel of the New Zealand Wars
Companions of the Order of the Bath
British Army personnel of the Mahdist War
Military personnel from Norfolk
People from Broadland (district)
People from Sydney